The 1993 Pepsi Canadian Junior Curling Championships were held in Trois-Rivieres, Quebec.

Men's

Teams

Standings

Results

Draw 1

Draw 2

Draw 3

Draw 4

Draw 5

Draw 6

Draw 7

Draw 8

Draw 9

Draw 10

Draw 11

Draw 12

Draw 13

Draw 14

Draw 15

Draw 16

Draw 17

Playoffs

Tiebreaker

Semifinals

Final

Women's

Teams

Standings

Results

Draw 1

Draw 2

Draw 3

Draw 4

Draw 5

Draw 6

Draw 7

Draw 8

Draw 9

Draw 10

Draw 11

Draw 12

Draw 13

Draw 14

Draw 15

Draw 16

Draw 17

Playoffs

Tiebreaker #1

Tiebreaker #2

Semifinal

Final

External links
Men's statistics
Women's statistics

Canadian Junior Curling Championships
Curling competitions in Quebec
Sport in Trois-Rivières
Canadian Junior Curling Championships
1993 in Quebec